Video game director may refer to:

 Video game producer, the person in charge of overseeing development of a video game
 Technical director, usually a senior technical person within creative group
 Art director, a blanket title for a variety of similar job functions
 Creative director, a position often found within creative organizations
 Sound director, the head of the sound department

Video game director may also refer to the lead roles of:

 Video game developer, a software developer that creates video games
 Video game designer, a person who designs gameplay
 Video game programmer,  a person who primarily develops codebase for video games or related software